Vasili Rogov (born November 3, 1991) is an Israeli ice dancer. With Allison Reed, he is the 2014 Tallinn Trophy champion and 2015 Bavarian Open silver medalist. They qualified for the free dance at two ISU Championships.

Skating career 
Rogov began learning to skate in 1998. After an early partnership with Olga Klimkovich, he teamed up with Ekaterina Bugrov in the summer of 2010. Bugrov/Rogov competed together for two seasons, representing Israel. They appeared at four ISU Championships – the 2011 World Junior Championships in Gangneung, South Korea; the 2012 World Junior Championships in Minsk, Belarus; the 2012 European Championships in Sheffield, England; and the 2012 World Championships in Nice, France – but never qualified for the free dance. They were coached by Galit Chait Moracci and Inese Bucevica in Hackensack, New Jersey.

In 2012, Rogov teamed up with Allison Reed. They withdrew from the 2013 European Championships, held in Zagreb, due to Rogov's illness. In their third season together, Reed/Rogov won gold at the Tallinn Trophy and silver at the Bavarian Open. They also reached the free dance at two ISU Championships – 2015 Europeans in Stockholm and 2015 Worlds in Shanghai. They were coached by Galit Chait Moracci, Tyler Myles, Alexei Gorshkov, and John Kerr in Hackensack.

Programs

With Reed

With Bugrov

Competitive highlights 
CS: Challenger Series; JGP: Junior Grand Prix

With Reed

With Bugrov

See also
Sports in Israel

References 

 

1991 births
Israeli male ice dancers
Living people
Figure skaters from Minsk